The demographic characteristics of the population of The Gambia are known through national censuses, conducted in ten-year intervals and analyzed by The Gambian Bureau of Statistics (GBOS) since 1963. The latest census was conducted in 2013. The population of The Gambia at the 2013 census was 1.8 million. The population density is 176.1 per square kilometer, and the overall life expectancy in The Gambia is 64.1 years. Since the first census of 1963, the population of The Gambia has increased every ten years by an average of 43.2 percent. Since 1950s, the birth rate has constantly exceeded the death rate; the natural growth rate is positive. The Gambia is in the second stage of demographic transition. In terms of age structure, The Gambia is dominated by 15- to 24-year-old segment (57.6%). The median age of the population is 19.9 years, and the gender ratio of the total population is 0.98 males per female.

Population 

With a population of 1.88 million in 2013, The Gambia ranks 149th in the world by population. Its population density is 176.1 inhabitants per square kilometer (456.1 inhabitants per square mile). The overall life expectancy in The Gambia is 64.1 years. The total fertility rate of 3.98 is one of the highest in the world. Since 1950, the United Nations (UN) estimated the birth rate exceeds the death rate. The Gambia Bureau of Statistics (GBOS) estimates the population of The Gambia is expected to reach 3.6 million in 20 years. The population of The Gambia has increased each census, starting with 315 thousand in 1963 to 1.8 million in 2013. The GBOS predicted the reason for the increase from 2003 to 2013 was more coverage in the latter census compared to the former's.

Vital statistics
Registration of vital events in Gambia is not complete. The Population Department of the United Nations prepared the following estimates.

Fertility Rate (The Demographic Health Survey and Multiple Indicator Cluster Surveys) 

Sources:

Fertility Rate TFR (Wanted Fertility Rate) and CBR (Crude Birth Rate):

Structure of the population (DHS 2013) (males 23,904, females 25,649, total 49,553) :

Population Estimates by Sex and Age Group (30.XII.2015): 

Fertility data as of 2019-20 (DHS Program):

Life expectancy

Other demographic statistics 

Demographic statistics according to the World Population Review in 2022.

One birth every 6 minutes	
One death every 29 minutes	
One net migrant every 180 minutes	
Net gain of one person every 7 minutes

The following demographic statistics are from the CIA World Factbook.

Population
2,413,403 (2022 est.)
2,092,731 (July 2018 est.)

Religions
Muslim 96.4%, Christian 3.5%, other or none 0.1% (2019-20 est.)

Age structure

0-14 years: 35.15% (male 391,993/female 388,816)
15-24 years: 20.12% (male 221,519/female 225,414)
25-54 years: 36.39% (male 396,261/female 412,122)
55-64 years: 4.53% (male 48,032/female 52,538)
65 years and over: 3.81% (male 38,805/female 45,801)  (2021 est.)

0-14 years: 36.97% (male 388,615 /female 385,172)
15-24 years: 20.31% (male 210,217 /female 214,807)
25-54 years: 34.9% (male 357,934 /female 372,428)
55-64 years: 4.26% (male 42,655 /female 46,591)
65 years and over: 3.55% (male 34,328 /female 39,984) (2018 est.)

Birth rate
28.78 births/1,000 population (2022 est.) Country comparison to the world: 32nd
28.6 births/1,000 population (2018 est.) Country comparison to the world: 43rd

Death rate
5.81 deaths/1,000 population (2022 est.) Country comparison to the world: 167th
6.9 deaths/1,000 population (2018 est.) Country comparison to the world: 132nd

Total fertility rate
3.79 children born/woman (2022 est.) Country comparison to the world: 32nd
3.42 children born/woman (2018 est.) Country comparison to the world: 44th

Median age
total: 21.8 years. Country comparison to the world: 182nd
male: 21.5 years
female: 22.2 years (2020 est.)

total: 21.3 years. Country comparison to the world: 184th
male: 20.9 years 
female: 21.6 years (2018 est.)

Population growth rate
2.29% (2022 est.) Country comparison to the world: 33rd
1.99% (2018 est.) Country comparison to the world: 48th

Mother's mean age at first birth
20.7 years (2019/20 est.)
note: median age at first birth among women 25-49

20.9 years (2013 est.)
note: median age at first birth among women 25-29

Contraceptive prevalence rate
16.8% (2018)
note: percent of women aged 15-49

9% (2013)

Net migration rate
-0.04 migrant(s)/1,000 population (2022 est.) Country comparison to the world: 99th
-1.9 migrant(s)/1,000 population (2017 est.) Country comparison to the world: 158th

Dependency ratios
total dependency ratio: 92.3 (2015 est.)
youth dependency ratio: 87.8 (2015 est.)
elderly dependency ratio: 4.5 (2015 est.)
potential support ratio: 22.3 (2015 est.)

Urbanization
urban population: 63.9% of total population (2022)
rate of urbanization: 3.75% annual rate of change (2020-25 est.)

urban population: 61.3% of total population (2018)
rate of urbanization: 4.07% annual rate of change (2015-20 est.)

Life expectancy at birth
total population: 67.6 years. Country comparison to the world: 188th
male: 65.83 years
female: 69.41 years (2022 est.)

total population: 65.4 years (2018 est.)
male: 63 years (2018 est.)
female: 67.8 years (2018 est.)

Education expenditures
2.9% of GDP (2019) Country comparison to the world: 154th

Literacy
definition: age 15 and over can read and write (2015 est.)
total population: 50.8%
male: 61.8%
female: 41.6% (2015)

School life expectancy (primary to tertiary education)
total: 9 years (2010)
male: 9 years (2010)
female: 9 years (2010)

Major infectious diseases
degree of risk: very high (2020)
food or waterborne diseases: bacterial and protozoal diarrhea, hepatitis A, and typhoid fever
vectorborne diseases: malaria and dengue fever
water contact diseases: schistosomiasis
animal contact diseases: rabies
respiratory diseases: meningococcal meningitis

note: on 21 March 2022, the US Centers for Disease Control and Prevention (CDC) issued a Travel Alert for polio in Africa; The Gambia is currently considered a high risk to travelers for circulating vaccine-derived polioviruses (cVDPV); vaccine-derived poliovirus (VDPV) is a strain of the weakened poliovirus that was initially included in oral polio vaccine (OPV) and that has changed over time and behaves more like the wild or naturally occurring virus; this means it can be spread more easily to people who are unvaccinated against polio and who come in contact with the stool or respiratory secretions, such as from a sneeze, of an “infected” person who received oral polio vaccine; the CDC recommends that before any international travel, anyone unvaccinated, incompletely vaccinated, or with an unknown polio vaccination status should complete the routine polio vaccine series; before travel to any high-risk destination, CDC recommends that adults who previously completed the full, routine polio vaccine series receive a single, lifetime booster dose of polio vaccine

Unemployment, youth ages 15-24
total: 25.8%
male: 21%
female: 32.3% (2018 est.)

See also
Languages of the Gambia
Religion in the Gambia

References

References 

 

 
Society of the Gambia